In 1976, Salsoul Records released their eighth release, Walter Gibbons' remix of Double Exposure's disco song "Ten Percent". "Ten Percent" was the first commercially available 12-inch single. Although, according to the record label, the actual title of this record is Ten Per Cent, not Ten Percent.

The 12-inch single was reserved for DJs until the release of "Ten Percent." Disco had already begun to exploit the 12-inch's allowance for higher volumes, better sound quality, and longer playing time, but no record companies had previously seen commercial value in the new format.

Production
Ken Cayre, the head of Salsoul Records, decided to sign a number of famous musicians and bands to the label, hoping to "consolidate the success of the faceless Salsoul Orchestra", and Double Exposure was chosen as the newly signed band whose first release, "Ten Percent," would feature the orchestra and be promoted with a 12-inch single as well as the typical seven-inch format.  Walter Gibbons was a DJ, not a producer, but his innovative skills, along with his punctuality and serious nature, got Gibbons the "Ten Percent" assignment at Salsoul Records.  One of his original techniques was "taking two records and working them back and forth in order to extend the drum breaks," a technique he applied to the "Ten Percent" mix, which displeased the original songwriter, Allan Felder, but which was supported by Salsoul in the front-page story in which Billboard magazine covered the release.  It was "mostly an exercise in stretching the original track out," and Gibbons transformed it from a "four-minute song into a nine-minute-forty-five-second-cut-and-paste roller coaster."

Public reaction
When Gibbons first played the "Ten Percent" 12" remix at Galaxy 21, where he was a regular DJ. One witness said, "It sounded so new, going backwards and forwards. It built and built like it would never stop. The dance floor just exploded."

Chart history

Release
Release Date: May, 1976:
Album Jacket: 4-colors, with a center window showing the record's label
Price: $2.98
Speed: 45rpm
Publicity: front-page stories in Billboard magazine and Record World

Effects on dance music
"Ten Percent" was a "dancefloor stormer that radically changed the disco underground in terms of record production."  The release "signalled the rise of remixers", and the rise of the DJ.

References

External links
Mixed With Love: The Musical World Of Walter Gibbons

1976 singles
Disco songs
Songs written by Allan Felder
1976 songs